Grikurov Ridge is a ridge that extends westward for about  from the south end of the LeMay Range, in central Alexander Island, Antarctica. The feature was mapped from trimetrogon air photography taken by the Ronne Antarctic Research Expedition, 1947–48, and from survey by the Falkland Islands Dependencies Survey, 1948–50. It was named by the UK Antarctic Place-Names Committee for the Russian Garrik Grikurov, a Soviet exchange geologist with the British Antarctic Survey, who worked in this area in 1963–64.

See also
 Offset Ridge
 Pagoda Ridge
 Polarstar Ridge

References

Ridges of Alexander Island